Sarta (also Romanized as Sartā) is a village in Kuhdasht-e Gharbi Rural District, in the Central District of Miandorud County, Mazandaran Province, Iran. At the 2006 census, its population was 68, in 25 families.

References 

Populated places in Miandorud County